The Solina String Synthesizer, also erroneously known as the ARP Solina String Synthesizer or sometimes the ARP String Synthesizer, is a combination of a string synthesizer and synthesizer. It is a hybrid model which combined both the Solina String Ensemble string synthesizer and the ARP Explorer monophonic synthesizer.  It was built in Bodegraven, Netherlands by Eminent B.V.  Supposedly only about 100 were ever produced. The addition of the ARP Explorer to the Solina string sounds made for a very powerful combination.

Keyboard modes

 Strings Only
 Strings through the Explorer low-pass filter
 Explorer voice combined with the lower Solina keyboard (contrabass and cello)
 Explorer voice combined with the upper Solina keyboard (viola, violin, trumpet, horn)

Variations 

The manufacturer of Solina series, Eminent B.V., also shipped a home organ model, named Solina C112s (with "Explore I" logo), which included ARP Explorer I.

References

String synthesizers
ARP synthesizers
Polyphonic synthesizers
Analog synthesizers